Stephanie Hym Lee (née Bell; born April 16, 1989) is an American professional wrestler. She is currently signed to WWE, where she performs on the Raw brand under the ring name "Michin" Mia Yim and is a member of The O.C.. She is also known for her time in Impact Wrestling, where she is a former Impact Knockouts Champion.

During her career, Yim has performed for WWE (where she was briefly known as Reckoning as part of the faction Retribution) Impact Wrestling, Combat Zone Wrestling (CZW), Shine Wrestling, and Shimmer Women Athletes. In Shine, she has held both the Shine Championship and the Shine Tag Team Championship (with Leva Bates). In addition, she has wrestled in Japan for Reina Joshi Puroresu.

Early life 
Stephanie Hym Bell was born on April 16, 1989 in Los Angeles, California. Her father is African-American and her mother is Korean. Bell played volleyball at James Madison High School in the Washington, D.C. suburb of Vienna, Virginia. She then attended Marymount University on a volleyball scholarship, where she studied information technology. She played volleyball until her senior year.

Professional wrestling career

Early career 
A fan of professional wrestling since her childhood, Bell began training at a wrestling school in Manassas, Virginia at the age of 18, while attending college. She trained for eighteen months before making her debut on August 22, 2009, adopting the ring name Mia Yim, and initially working primarily for independent promotions in Virginia. After taking bookings outside of Virginia, she wrestled for Jersey All Pro Wrestling (JAPW), facing wrestlers including Annie Social, Angeldust, and Brittany Force. During this time, she met Daizee Haze, through whom she began training at the Ring of Honor (ROH) Wrestling Academy and working for ROH. In ROH, she performed valet duties for The Embassy, beginning in 2011. Yim also wrestled sporadically for ROH, taking on MsChif and Sara Del Rey. In addition, she worked for the International Wrestling Cartel, Real Championship Wrestling, Northeast Wrestling, and Maryland Championship Wrestling (MCW) during her early years in wrestling.

After graduating from college, Yim received an invitation to train and wrestle in Japan with Universal Woman's Pro Wrestling Reina in 2011. Through Reina's relationship with Consejo Mundial de Lucha Libre, Yim also learned Mexican lucha libre.

Combat Zone Wrestling (2010–2012) 
After training with D. J. Hyde at the Combat Zone Wrestling (CZW) training school, Yim began working for CZW as a manager for Adam Cole. Debuting at Cage of Death II in December 2010, the two were presented as a storyline couple, and Yim regularly interfered in Cole's matches to help him win. After helping Cole gain a victory over Greg Excellent at Down With The Sickness 2011 in September, Excellent began feuding with the pair. As part of the storyline, Yim faced Excellent in an intergender match at Night Of Infamy 10: Ultimatum in November. After losing a rematch in January 2012, Yim challenged Excellent to a Tables, Ladders, and Chairs match at Aerial Assault 2012, which Yim won, to conclude the feud. She made only two more appearances for CZW that year before leaving the promotion.

Shine Wrestling (2012–2015) 

Yim debuted for Shine Wrestling at their second show in August 2012, defeating Sassy Stephie. Throughout 2012 and 2013, she faced wrestlers including Jessicka Havok and Tina San Antonio, before entering the tournament to determine the inaugural Shine Champion. She defeated Mercedes Martinez at Shine 10 in May 2013, and at Shine 11, she defeated Leva Bates and Ivelisse Vélez en route to the final, where she lost to Rain. As part of Shine, she also appeared for Evolve, taking on Vélez and Su Yung in showcase matches.

On February 28, 2014, at Shine 17, Yim teamed with Leva Bates during the Shine Tag Team Championship tournament, forming the tag team The Lucha Sisters. They defeated the teams of Cherry Bomb and Kimber Lee, and Sassy Stephie and Jessie Belle Smothers en route to the final, where they defeated Made In Sin (Allysin Kay and Taylor Made) to become the inaugural Shine Tag Team Champions. They successfully defended the championship against Nevaeh and Sassy Stephie, and against the team of Evie and Madison Eagles at Shine 18, but lost it to Legendary (Malia Hosaka and Brandi Wine) at Shine 20 on June 27. The Lucha Sisters failed to regain the title in a rematch in August at Shine 21.

On November 16, 2014, during the WWNLive tour in China, Yim defeated Ivelisse Vélez to win the Shine Championship, making her the first woman to have held both the Shine Championship and Shine Tag Team Championship. At Shine 26 on April 3, 2015, Yim lost the championship to NWA World Women's Champion Santana Garrett in a title vs. title match.

At Shine 28, Yim was defeated by Allysin Kay, and began showing signs of a heel turn when she blamed Leva Bates for the loss. Yim turned villainous at Shine 31 on December 11, 2015, when she attacked Leva Bates after the duo lost to Marti Belle and Jayme Jameson in a match for the vacant SHINE Tag Team Championship.

Shimmer Women Athletes (2013) 

Yim made her debut for Shimmer Women Athletes on April 6, 2013, at Volume 53 with a loss to Amazing Kong. She earned her first victory at Volume 56 later that month against Evie, before a series of losses to Jessicka Havok, Hikaru Shida, and Madison Eagles. After victories over Melanie Cruise, Angie Skye, and Hikaru Shida, Yim unsuccessfully challenged Cheerleader Melissa for the Shimmer Championship at Volume 65 in April 2014. Yim finished out 2014 facing wrestlers including Ray, Akino, and Tsukasa Fujimoto.

Full Impact Pro (2013) 
In April 2013, Yim debuted for Full Impact Pro, defeating Larry Dallas in an intergender match. In August, Yim and Dos Ben Dejos (Jay Rios and Eddie Cruz) defeated Dallas and The Now (Vik Dalishus and Hale Collins) in a Tables, Ladders, and Chairs match when Yim pinned Dallas. Yim spent the next several months managing Dos Ben Dejos, along with Leva Bates, while also wrestling in Shine showcase matches against Jessicka Havok and Ivelisse Vélez. In June 2014, The Lucha Sisters successfully defended the Shine Tag Team Championship against Vélez and Candice LeRae at an FIP event. In January 2015, Yim lost to Santana in a Shine showcase match.

Total Nonstop Action Wrestling / Impact Wrestling

Early appearances (2010–2015) 
Yim wrestled a dark match for Total Nonstop Action Wrestling (TNA) in mid-2010, while on vacation in Florida with her family. In March 2013, Yim competed at TNA's Knockouts Knockdown pay-per-view, where she was defeated by Tara. She returned to the promotion in May 2014 for Knockouts Knockdown 2, where she defeated Brittany to qualify for the gauntlet match later that night, in which she was eliminated by Taryn Terrell. Yim made a third appearance in 2015 at Knockouts Knockdown 3, losing to Brooke.

The Dollhouse (2015–2016) 
In April 2015, TNA began airing vignettes promoting The Dollhouse (Yim and Marti Bell)'s debut, in which Yim's ring name was changed to Jade. Jade and Bell debuted on the TKO: Night of Knockouts edition of Impact Wrestling on April 24, where Jade lost to Laura Dennis by disqualification after the two attacked referee Brian Stiffler as well as ring announcer Christy Hemme, establishing themselves as heels in the process. Later that night, Jade and Marti helped Taryn Terrell retain her TNA Women's Knockout Championship against Awesome Kong, with Terrell joining The Dollhouse in the process. The Dollhouse wrestled their first match as a team on the May 8 episode of Impact Wrestling, where they defeated Awesome Kong and Gail Kim in a 3–on–2 handicap match. Jade and Bell would regularly interfere in Terrell's championship matches and ensure the win for her. At Slammiversary XIII, The Dollhouse lost to Awesome Kong and Brooke in another 3–on–2 handicap match. On the July 15 episode of Impact Wrestling, Terrell lost the championship to Brooke, after Gail Kim returned and attacked Jade, causing a distraction. On the Turning Point special episode of Impact Wrestling on August 19, Jade and Bell competed in a 2-on-1 handicap six sides of steel cage match against Gail Kim, which Kim would win.

On the September 23 episode of Impact Wrestling, Jade unsuccessfully challenged Gail Kim for the TNA Women's Knockout Championship. On February 23, 2016, during the Lockdown special episode of Impact Wrestling, Jade scored the pinfall over Kim in a six–Knockout Lethal Lockdown match, as a result, Jade received another shot at Kim's TNA Women's Knockout Championship, two weeks later, but failed to win the title.

TNA Knockouts Champion (2016–2017) 
On April 5, Jade defeated Kim and Madison Rayne in a three–way match to win the TNA Knockouts Championship for the first time. On the same day, during the tapings for Knockouts Knockdown 4, Jade went on to defeat Leva Bates and the gauntlet match, with lastly eliminating Madison Rayne, to become the new "Queen of the Knockouts". In her first title defense, on the April 12 episode of Impact Wrestling, Jade defeated Madison Rayne to retain her championship.

In late April, Jade started a feud with Knockouts Commissioner Maria which led to her first face turn since signing with the company. Few weeks later, she was attacked by the debuting Sienna after she refused to lay down for Maria. On the May 10 episode of Impact Wrestling, Jade successfully defended her title against Kim by DQ after Sienna attacked them. Jade was then scheduled to face Maria's bodyguard Sienna at Slammiversary with the title on the line. On the May 31 episode of Impact Wrestling, Jade teamed up with her former rival Kim to defeat Sienna and Allie in a tag-team match. At Slammiversary, Jade would lose the Knockouts Championship to Sienna after Marti Bell hit Jade in the back with a baton in a triple threat match that also featured Kim, ending her reign at 87 days.

On August 25, 2016, at Turning Point Jade competed in a Five–way match  against the champion Sienna, Marti Bell, Madison Rayne and Allie for the TNA Knockouts Championship, which was won by Allie. At Bound for Glory, Jade defeated Sienna. On the December 2 episode of Impact Wrestling, Jade lost to Rosemary in a "Six Sides of Steel" cage match for the vacated TNA Knockouts Championship. In mid–January 2017, the feud between Rosemary and Jade re–emerged and this led to a Monster's ball match, where Rosemary defeated Jade to retain her championship. Jade received a rematch against Rosemary on the March 2 episode of Impact Wrestling, in a Last Knockout Standing match, which she lost. This was Jade's last match in TNA, and it was officially announced earlier in the week that she was not signed to a new contract and confirming her departure from the company.

WWE

Early appearances (2014–2018) 
In 2014 and 2015, Yim appeared in the WWE a number of times as one of Adam Rose's rose buds. She also worked as enhancement talent for WWE's developmental territory NXT at the October 2014 television tapings, losing to Charlotte.

On July 13, 2017, Yim returned to WWE by entering the Mae Young Classic tournament, defeating Sarah Logan in her first round match. The following day, Yim was eliminated from the tournament in the second round by Shayna Baszler. On August 9, 2018, Yim once again returned to the WWE by entering the Mae Young Classic tournament for the second time, defeating Allysin Kay in the first round and the returning Kaitlyn in the second before losing to Toni Storm in the quarterfinals.

NXT (2018–2020) 
Thanks to her performance at the Mae Young Classic, on September 24, it was confirmed that Yim was signed to a contract with WWE and would begin working at NXT. Just a month later, on the October 24 episode of NXT, Yim made her in–ring debut as part of the brand, defeating Aliyah, thus establishing herself as a face. In November, after a backstage altercation between the two, Yim faced Bianca Belair who would hand her first loss and that would also spark a feud between the two. Yim was able to bounce off the loss and defeat Reina Gonzalez to earn herself a spot for an upcoming fatal–four-way match to determine the number one contender for the NXT Women's Championship, however, the match was won by Belair. Shortly after Belair's undefeated streak was ended, Yim was able to defeat her in two different matches to end their feud.

On August 10 at NXT TakeOver: Toronto, Yim lost to Shayna Baszler in an NXT Women's Championship match. In November, Yim made her main roster debut as part of the NXT talent that were placed in an invasion angle with Raw and SmackDown as part of the Survivor Series pay-per-view. Yim was chosen by Rhea Ripley to join her team for the first-ever women's WarGames match against Shayna Baszler's team. On November 23 at NXT TakeOver: WarGames, just before the match took place, Yim was attacked backstage and unable to compete in the women's WarGames match. However, Yim was replaced by Dakota Kai on Team Ripley, who eventually turned on Team Ripley and attacked Tegan Nox. 11 days later on the December 4 episode of NXT, Yim revealed that Kai attacked her backstage and this led to a grudge match the following week, which Yim lost. On June 7, 2020, at TakeOver: In Your House, Yim teamed up with Nox and Shotzi Blackheart against and defeated Kai, Raquel Gonzalez and Candice LeRae in a six-woman tag team match.

Retribution (2020–2021) 
On the September 21, 2020 edition of Raw, several weeks after her last appearance on NXT, Mia Yim turned heel in her main roster debut by revealing herself as a member of the villainous stable Retribution under the ring name Reckoning. Yim made her ring-debut on the November 30, 2020 of Raw, in a losing effort against Dana Brooke Throughout February and March, tension was teased among the group as the group's leader, Mustafa Ali, would publicly berate the rest of the group whenever they lost a match. This culminated at Fastlane, when Reckoning walked out on Ali along with Slapjack, while Mace and T-Bar gave Ali a double chokeslam, effectively disbanding the group. Two months later, Yim was assigned to the SmackDown brand. In July, Yim was traded back to the Raw brand in exchange for Naomi. As part of the 2021 Draft, the Reckoning character was quietly dropped as Yim was officially drafted to the Raw brand. On November 4, 2021, Yim was released from her WWE contract without ever reappearing on television.

Return to the independent circuit (2022) 
On March 31, 2022, Yim made her in-ring return during the WrestleCon Mark Hitchcock Memorial Super Show, where she defeated Athena.

Return to Impact Wrestling (2022) 
At Under Siege, on May 7, 2022, Bell, using the Mia Yim name instead of Jade, made her return to TNA (now known as Impact Wrestling), saving Taya Valkyrie from an attack by Deonna Purrazzo. On the May 19 episode of Impact!, Yim had her first match at Impact in five years, where she alongside Jordynne Grace and Valkyrie defeated the team of Purrazzo, Savannah Evans and the Knockouts World Champion Tasha Steelz. On June 19 at Slammiversary, she competed in the inaugural Queen of the Mountain match for the Knockouts World Championship, which was won by Grace. On July 1 at Against All Odds, Yim teamed with Mickie James and fought Purrazzo and Chelsea Green in a losing effort. On August 12 at Emergence, Yim challenged Grace for the Knockouts World Championship, but failed to win the title. On September 23 at Victory Road, Yim competed in an Intergender Triple Threat Revolver to determine the number one contender for the X Division Championship, eliminating Laredo Kid and Alex Zayne but was eliminated by Kenny King. She was defeated by Mickie James at Bound for Glory and, three days later, she left the company. On the October 20 episode of Impact!, Yim wrestled her last match for the company by facing Taylor Wilde in a losing effort.

Return to WWE (2022–present) 
On the November 7, 2022 episode of Raw, Yim returned to WWE as a face, attacking Rhea Ripley of The Judgment Day and aligning with The O.C.. Her ring name was briefly changed to Michin, before being quickly altered to have "Michin" be a nickname rather than her full ring name. Three weeks later at Survivor Series WarGames on 26 November, Yim's team defeated Ripley's team after Becky Lynch pinned Dakota Kai in a WarGames match.

On 28 January 2023, Yim entered the Women's Royal Rumble match, entering at number 23 and lasted for more than seventeen minutes before being eliminated by Piper Niven.

Personal life 
On February 11, 2021, Bell got engaged to fellow professional wrestler Keith Lee. The couple married on February 5, 2022.

Other media 
As Mia Yim, she made her video game debut as a playable character in WWE 2K20. She also appears in WWE 2K22 as both Mia Yim and Reckoning.

She streams on Twitch under the name "OfficialMiaYim".

Filmography

Championships and accomplishments 
 BBC
100 Women (2016)
 Big Time Wrestling
 BTW Women's Championship (1 time)
 DDT Pro-Wrestling
 Ironman Heavymetalweight Championship (1 time)
 Florida Underground Wrestling
 NWA FUW Women’s Championship (1 time, inaugural)
 Pro Wrestling Illustrated
 Ranked No. 6 of the top 50 female wrestlers in the PWI Female 50 in 2016
 Shine Wrestling
 Shine Championship (1 time)
 Shine Tag Team Championship (1 time) – with Leva Bates
 Shine Tag Team Title Tournament (2014)
 Tidal Championship Wrestling
 TCW Women's Championship (1 time)
 Total Nonstop Action Wrestling
 TNA Knockouts Championship (1 time)
 Queen of the Knockouts (2016)
 TNA World Cup (2016) – with Jeff Hardy, Eddie Edwards, Jessie Godderz, and Robbie E
 Southside Wrestling
 Queen of Southside Championship (1 time)
 WrestleCrap
 Gooker Award (2020) –

References

External links 

 
 
 
 

1989 births
Living people
American female professional wrestlers
American people of Korean descent
African-American female professional wrestlers
BBC 100 Women
Professional wrestlers from California
Professional wrestling managers and valets
South Korean female professional wrestlers
Sportspeople from Los Angeles County, California
Sportspeople from San Bernardino, California
Twitch (service) streamers
20th-century African-American people
20th-century African-American women
21st-century African-American sportspeople
21st-century African-American women
21st-century professional wrestlers
TNA/Impact Knockouts World Champions
Ironman Heavymetalweight Champions